Luciano "Lucho" Gastón Vega Albornoz (born 9 April 1999) is an Argentine professional footballer who plays as a midfielder for Portuguese club Sporting Covilhã on loan from Marítimo.

Career
A youth product of Deportivo Atalaya and River Plate, Vega signed his first professional contract with the Argentine club on 31 January 2020 and went on a 2-year loan to Estoril. He transferred permanently to Estoril on 31 March 2021.

Vega made his professional debut with Estoril in a 2–1 Taça da Liga win over C.D. Nacional on 25 July 2021. He made his Primeira Liga debut on 7 August, replacing Loreintz Rosier late into a 2–0 win at F.C. Arouca.

On 31 August 2021, Vega moved to Spanish Segunda División side AD Alcorcón on a one-year loan deal.

On 2 July 2022, Vega moved to Madeira to sign for Marítimo for three seasons. In January 2023 he went on loan to Sporting Covilhã on the second Portuguese tier.

References

External links
 
 
 

1999 births
Living people
Footballers from Córdoba, Argentina
Argentine footballers
G.D. Estoril Praia players
C.S. Marítimo players
S.C. Covilhã players
Primeira Liga players
Liga Portugal 2 players
AD Alcorcón footballers
Segunda División players
Association football midfielders
Argentine expatriate footballers
Argentine expatriate sportspeople in Portugal
Argentine expatriate sportspeople in Spain
Expatriate footballers in Portugal
Expatriate footballers in Spain